Eshkolot (lit. Bunches) is a secular Israeli settlement in the southern Judaean Mountains of the West Bank. Located around five kilometers from Lahav, it is organized as a community settlement and falls within the jurisdiction of the Har Hevron Regional Council.

The international community considers Israeli settlements in the West Bank illegal under international law, but the Israeli government disputes this.

History
The village was first established in 1982 as a Nahal settlement and was turned over to civilians in 1991. The name of the city is taken from the well-known vineyards in Hebron.

Some of its residents own lands and are farming wheat, barley, grapes, olives, figs and pomegranates and even some few dates while others are working in other places, in particular Beersheba.
There are two local wineries currently being built.

See also

Eshkolot (Jewish Studies book series)

External links
Eshkolot Negev Information Centre

References

Nahal settlements
Non-religious Israeli settlements
Populated places established in 1982
1982 establishments in the Palestinian territories
Community settlements